is a Japanese web novel series written by Katarina. Its serialization began on the novel publishing website Shōsetsuka ni Narō in May 2017. No printed version of the novel series has been published yet. A manga adaptation, illustrated by Ryosuke Fuji, has been serialized in Kodansha's Weekly Shōnen Magazine since July 2020. An anime television series adaptation by C2C is set to premiere in October 2023.

Plot
The story is set in the near future, where games that use old-fashioned display screens are classified as retro games, while full-dive VR games have become commonplace. As a result of these games becoming mainstream, there exist many so-called "trash games": rushed, full of glitches, faulty games, the systems of which have not kept up with the improved visual technology. , is a "trash game hunter", a great admirer of these usually shameful games, which he plays with the nickname , until he's able to master them regardless of the difficulty due to their glitches. Rakuro has cleared the oversized "Faeria Chronicle Online" trash game, and is suffering a sort of burnout syndrome. At the suggestion of the owner of his favorite game store, "RockRoll", he buys the best-selling and excellent "Shangri-La Frontier", a full-dive VR game with 30 million registered players. He enters the world of Shangri-La Frontier as the player character Sunraku, where all the skills he has attained as an expert trash game hunter will come in handy as he progresses in the game.

Characters
 / 

 / 

 / 

 /

Production
The author Katarina read The Irregular at Magic High School on Shōsetsuka ni Narō while living overseas. He found the novel interesting and therefore started to think of writing novels. At that time, reincarnation-type stories were popular in that website and there was a period that he read only fantasy stories. However, he once read a virtual reality-type story and found it very amazing. Inspired by that work, he started writing Shangri-La Frontier.

The anime project was proposed in February 2020, which was before the serialization of the manga series.

Media

Web novel
The series written by Katarina was serialized online from May 2017 on the user-generated novel publishing website Shōsetsuka ni Narō. No printed version of the novel series has been published yet.

Manga
A manga adaptation illustrated by Ryosuke Fuji has been serialized in Kodansha's Weekly Shōnen Magazine since July 15, 2020. Kodansha has collected its chapters into individual tankōbon volumes. The first volume was released on October 16, 2020. A promotional video, narrated by Azumi Waki and featuring Yuma Uchida as Sunraku, was posted on July 7, 2021, for the series' first anniversary. As of December 16, 2022, eleven volumes have been released.

In North America, Kodansha USA announced the English language digital release of the manga in November 2020. In November 2021, Kodansha USA announced that they would begin releasing the series in print, with the first volume set to be released on September 6, 2022.

Volume list

Anime
On July 7, 2022, an anime television series adaptation produced by C2C was announced. The series will be directed by Toshiyuki Kubooka, with Hiroki Ikeshita serving as assistant director, Kazuyuki Fudeyasu supervising and writing the series' scripts, Ayumi Kurashima designing the characters, and Monaca composing the music. It is set to premiere in October 2023. Crunchyroll has licensed the series.

Video game
On July 7, 2022, a video game developed by Netmarble Nexus and published by Netmarble was announced.

Reception
The manga series ranked #11 on the "Nationwide Bookstore Employees' Recommended Comics of 2021" by the Honya Club website. The series was placed 5th in the 2021 Next Manga Award in the print category. The manga has been nominated for the 46th Kodansha Manga Award in the shōnen category in 2022.

See also
 Attack on Titan: Lost Girls: the manga adaptation of which was illustrated by Ryōsuke Fuji

Notes

References

External links
  at Shōsetsuka ni Narō 
  
 

2023 anime television series debuts
Action anime and manga
Anime and manga based on novels
C2C (studio)
Crunchyroll anime
Fantasy anime and manga
Kodansha manga
Shōnen manga
Shōsetsuka ni Narō
Upcoming anime television series